José Ornelas Carvalho, SCJ (born 5 January 1954) is a Portuguese prelate of the Catholic Church who has been bishop of Leiria-Fátima since 2022. He was the bishop of Setúbal from 2015 to 2022. He was the Superior-General of the Congregation of the Priests of the Sacred Heart, from 2003 to 2015.

He was elected to a three-year term as President of the Portuguese Episcopal Conference in 2020.

Early life 
José Ornelas Carvalho was born in 1954 in the parish of Porto da Cruz, in Machico, Madeira, the son of António Tomás Carvalho and Benvinda de Ornelas. He studied at the Diocesan Minor Seminary of Funchal from 1964 to 1967. Wishing to become a missionary, he joined the Missionary College of the Priests of the Sacred Heart in Funchal (1967-1969), and then studied at the Congregation's Missionary Institute in Coimbra (1969-1971).

On 29 September 1972 he made his temporary vows in Aveiro and, after two years of studies in Philosophy, he spent two years as a missionary in Mozambique, from 1974 to 1976. Back in Lisbon, he concluded his degree in Theology from the Catholic University of Portugal, in 1979.

Ordained ministry

Priesthood 
He was ordained priest on 9 August 1981, in his hometown of Porto da Cruz, in a ceremony presided by Maurílio de Gouveia, then Titular Archbishop of Mitylene. In 1983, he started teaching at the Faculty of Theology of the Catholic University of Portugal; he interrupted his teaching activities to prepare his doctorate in Biblical Theology in Rome and Germany, which he concluded on 14 July 1997. He also taught at the Major Seminary of Our Lady of Fátima, in Alfragide.

José Ornelas Carvalho was elected Superior General of the Congregation of the Priests of the Sacred Heart on 27 May 2003, after having served as the Provincial Superior of the Dehonian Portuguese Province. He was in the position until 6 June 2015.

Episcopate 
He was appointed Bishop of Setúbal on 24 August 2015, by Pope Francis, succeeding Gilberto Canavarro dos Reis; he received his episcopal consecration on 25 October 2015 from the Patriarch of Lisbon Manuel Clemente in the Cathedral of Our Lady of Grace, in Setúbal.

Pope Francis appointed him bishop of Leiria-Fátima on 28 January 2022. He was installed there on 13 March.

References

1954 births
21st-century Roman Catholic bishops in Portugal
Living people
People from Machico, Madeira
Dehonian bishops